Recuerdo de Amor (International title: Memories of Love) is a Philippine daytime drama crime series which aired on ABS-CBN's Dramathon sa Hapon afternoon block on May 14, 2001, to January 10, 2003, replacing Marinella and was replaced by Altagracia. It starred Carmina Villarroel and Diether Ocampo in their respective roles, alongside Pinky de Leon, Dante Rivero and Isabel Rivas.

The TV series was delayed on May 14 to 15, 2001, and ended on its original end date worldwide on TFC because ABS-CBN broadcast the election coverage that day. The series also nominated Isabel Rivas for Best Actress in a Drama Series by the PMPC in 2002 alongside actress Pinky De Leon, who was also part of the series. The series was known to use fast-paced TV filmography in the 45-minute premiere of its pilot episode. It was also known for getting outstanding reviews throughout its run to Filipino viewers who have The Filipino Channel internationally because of its memorable storyline and visual effects similar to a U.S. soap opera.

The series was also Pinky de Leon's penultimate TV series before she decided to retire from TV and film work (her final series was Forever in My Heart, which was broadcast by ABS-CBN's rival, GMA Network). The afternoon series was also competing with dramas such as Pangako Sa ’Yo and GMA Network's soap opera Kung Mawawala Ka, which premiered in April 2002.

This series was streaming on Jeepney TV YouTube Channel.

Premise
Recuerdo de Amor is an acclaimed afternoon television drama that chronicles on the complicated lives of Luisa (Carmina Villaroel) and Paulo (Diether Ocampo)
the story begins during the eerie years before adolescence Josefina and Antonio are happily in love raising their children Antonio succumbs to the dying obsession of Greta Villafuerte (Isabel Rivas) a cunning woman who has a web of self-destruction her love for Antonio succumbs to indeed have Antonio to have an affair with Greta, Josefina in the other hand must suffer the tragic fate of her love for Antonio and for the sake of her children. Greta on the other hand succeeds at plans of winning all hope to have Josefina taken out of her plans Paulo grows up with Greta and Antonio as lackluster pretty boy while Luisa is a young servant to the household as she grows up she and Paulo are back in each other's arms 15 years later. Luisa suffers at the hands of the Villafuertes. Greta who knows the real identity of Luisa wants to get rid of Luisa from the scene. Meanwhile, Greta's son Monching a happy go lucky guy was obsessed to his ex gf Trina, Paulo's bestfriend. When Trina broke up with Monching, Monching thinks that Paulo was the reason Trina left him. Eventually Trina fell in love with Paulo while she was helping Paulo and Luisa in their wedding preparation, however days before the wedding Trina kissed Paulo that became the reason why Luisa decided not to invite Trina in their wedding. When Monching found out what Trina did he went to Trina's house and killed Valentina Romero, Trina's grandmother. Instead of Monching being imprisoned because of what he did to Valentina, it was Paulo who got accused and was sentenced to jail of killing Valentina. Years passed the truth came out, Paulo got acquitted Trina came back from the U.S., Monching was imprisoned but also got acquitted. Trina was still in love with Paulo became ruthless and evil, she did everything just to get Paulo from Luisa. She even pretended she had cancer, which eventually turned out to be true.

Cast and characters

Main cast 
 Diether Ocampo as Paulo Jose Villafuerte / Ariel Sebastian
 Carmina Villarroel as Luisa Arellano / Rebecca Stuart
 Isabel Rivas as Greta Stuart-Villafuerte
 Pinky de Leon as Josephina "Josie" Sebastian
 Dante Rivero as Antonio Sebastian / Enrico Villafuerte

Supporting cast 
Tin Arnaldo as Trina Romero
Carlos Morales as Monching S. Villafuerte
Gloria Sevilla as Doña Conchita La Fuente
Perla Bautista as Carlotta / Ninang
Gandong Cervantes as Fernando Pascual
Angel Aquino as Sister Cecilia Sebastian
Baron Geisler as Francis Sebastian
Angelene Aguilar as Margarita Dumagat
Sylvia Sanchez as Beatrice Auble
Gladys Reyes as Maningning Muerto / Leila
Zoren Legaspi as Eugene Hernando

Minor cast 
Jhoana Marie Tan as Sheryl Villafuerte
Mon Confiado as Alberto
Bembol Roco as Ward
Niña de Sagun as Mai-Mai Arellano
Gilleth Sandico as Lovella
Cris Villanueva as Stanley Liu
Andre Tiangco as Dindo
Meg Reyes as Rosanna "Anna" Lagman and Bianca Agoncillo
Moreen Guese as Roselle
Crispin Pineda as Reden
Drinnie Aguilar as Catherine Villafuerte
Lui Villaruz as Miloy
Aurora Halili as Yvette / Janice
Lovely Rivero as Diana
Rey Sagum as Domeng
Nico Garcia as Caloy
Tess Dumpit as Choleng Muerto
Julio Pacheco as Nonoy
Ricky Rivero as Jezebel
Rina Reyes as Elbertina
Liz Alindogan as Dolor Resureccion / Atty. Maris Marquez
Menggie Cobarrubias as Atty. Montinola
Odette Khan as Nena
Jennifer Illustre as Teresa Agoncillo
Connie Chua as Tiyang Arcadia
Gerald Madrid as Lance Velez
Justin Cuyugan as Samuel
Eloy de Guzman as Wally
Mia Guterrez as Fake Dolor
Froilan Sales as Elias
Joe Gruta as Berto
Alex Del Rosario as Dave
Mari as Gerry
Nicole Yabut as Yvonne
Raquel Monteza as Mrs. Ilustre

Special participation
Yuuki Kadooka as Young Ariel Sebastian
Angel Gonzales as Young Cecilia Sebastian
John Manalo as Young Monching Villafuerte
Alwyn Uytingco as teen Monching Villafuerte
Emman Abeleda as Young Paulo Jose Villafuerte
Empress Schuck as Young Luisa Arellano
King Alcala as Young Francis
Dimples Romana as Young Josephina
Karlyn Bayot as Young Greta
Jennifer Sevilla as Janice / Lourdes

See also
List of programs broadcast by ABS-CBN
List of ABS-CBN original drama series

References

External links

ABS-CBN drama series
2001 Philippine television series debuts
2003 Philippine television series endings
Philippine action television series
Thriller television series
Filipino-language television shows
Television shows set in the Philippines